Nizhniye Cherni is a rural locality (a khutor) in Pimeno-Chernyanskoye Rural Settlement, Kotelnikovsky District, Volgograd Oblast, Russia. The population was 379 as of 2010. There are 17 streets.

Geography 
Nizhniye Cherni is located on the right bank of the Aksay Kurmoyarsky River, 33 km northeast of Kotelnikovo (the district's administrative centre) by road. Pimeno-Cherni is the nearest rural locality.

References 

Rural localities in Kotelnikovsky District